Asian Highway 71 (AH71) is a road in the Asian Highway Network running 390 km (245 miles) from Delaram, Afghanistan to Dashtak, Iran connecting AH1 to AH75
made with help of India 

. The route is as follows:

Afghanistan
Delaram–Zaranj Highway: Delaram - Zaranj

Iran
 Milak - Zabol
 : Zabol - Dashtak

References

External links 

 Iran road map on Young Journalists Club

Asian Highway Network

Roads in Afghanistan
Roads in Iran